Fabio Lombardi (born in 1961) is an Italian ethnomusicologist and organologist who studied, at the Bologna University, with Roberto Leydi, Tullia Magrini and the organologist Febo Guizzi.
Born in Meldola, Romagna, in the 1980s he made an ethnic musical field research in Emilia-Romagna, near Forlì and along the Bidente valley (Meldola, Cusercoli, Bertinoro, Predappio, Forlimpopoli, Civitella, Galeata, Santa Sofia, Bagno di Romagna) which has contributed to a better knowledge of Italian ethnic music (music of Italy), particularly regarding musical instruments: he discovered some unknown ethnic  instruments (ethnic instrument) both in Italy and Europe.
For example, see: a type of mirliton improperly named "Ocarina" kazoo.
Other Lombardi's works are on the local history of Meldola, Riccione, Forlì and other topics.

References

 Lombardi, Fabio, 2000, Canti e strumenti popolari della Romagna Bidentina, Società Editrice "Il Ponte Vecchio", Cesena
 Guizzi, Febo, 2002, Gli strumenti della musica popolare in Italia. Invaluable survey of popular instruments in use in Italy, ranging from percussion,wind and plucked instruments to various noise makers. Numerous drawings and plates. Wrappers. - Lucca : Alia Musica, 8. - 502 p. 
 Lombardi, Fabio, 1989, Mostra di strumenti musicali popolari romagnoli : Meldola Teatro Comunale G. A. Dragoni, 26-29 agosto 1989; raccolti da Fabio Lombardi nella vallata del bidente, Comuni di: Bagno di Romagna, S. Sofia, Meldola, Galeata, Forli, Civitella diR. e Forlimpopoli ; presentazione Roberto Leydi. - Forli : Provincia di Forli, 1989. - 56 p. : ill. ; 21 cm. In testa al front.: Provincia di Forli, Comune di Meldola. 
 Lombardi, Fabio, 2002,  Pievi di Romagna; foto di Gian Paolo Senni. - Cesena : Il ponte vecchio. - 95 p. : ill. ; 24 cm. ((In testa al front.: Progetti CRAL Carisp Cesena. 
 Lombardi, Fabio, 1996, Storia di Forli : per le scuole dell'obbligo e per quanti desiderano conoscere lo sviluppo storico della citta - Cesena : Il ponte vecchio, [1996]. - 155 p. : ill. ; 24 cm. Collana  Vicus ; 16 
 Lombardi, Fabio, 2001, Storia di Forli - 2. ed. - Cesena : Il Ponte Vecchio, [2001]. - 175 p. : ill. ; 24 cm.   
 Lombardi, Fabio, 2000, Storia di Meldola / - Cesena : Il ponte vecchio. - 204 p. : ill. ; 24 cm. 
 Lombardi, Fabio, 2002, Storia di Riccione / - Cesena : Il ponte vecchio. - 203 p. : ill. ; 24 cm. 
 Lombardi, Fabio, 2002, Pievi di Romagna; foto di Gian Paolo Senni. - Cesena : Il ponte vecchio. - 95 p. : ill. ; 24 cm. ((In testa al front.: Progetti CRAL Carisp Cesena.   
 Lombardi, Fabio, 2003, La musica nel fondo Piancastelli in "Carlo Piancastelli e il collezionismo in Italia tra Ottocento e Novecento" / a cura di Piergiorgio Brigliadori, Pantaleo Palmieri. - Bologna : Il mulino. - 246 p., [8] p. di tav : ill. ; 22 cm. 
Lombardi, Fabio, 2009, Briganti in Romagna. Secoli XVI-XIX. - Bologna : Il Ponte Vecchio (collana Vicus. Testi e documenti di storia locale). - 128 p. 

1961 births
Living people
People from Meldola
Italian musicologists